Chlamydopsinae is a subfamily of clown beetles in the family Histeridae. There are about 13 genera and more than 170 described species in Chlamydopsinae.

Genera
These 13 genera belong to the subfamily Chlamydopsinae:

 Ceratohister Reichensperger, 1924
 Chlamydonia Caterino, 2006
 Chlamydopsis Westwood, 1869
 Ectatommiphila Lea, 1914
 Eucurtia Mjöberg, 1912
 Eucurtiopsis Silvestri, 1926
 Gomyopsis Dégallier, 1984
 Kanakopsis Caterino, 2006
 Orectoscelis Lewis, 1903
 Papuopsis Caterino & Dégallier, 2007
 Pheidoliphila Lea, 1914
 Quasimodopsis Caterino & Dégallier, 2007
 Teretriopsis Caterino & Dégallier, 2007

References

Further reading

External links

 

Histeridae